Ishola Oyenusi (died 8 September 1971), popularly known as Dr. Ishola, was a notorious Nigerian armed robber who was active during the 1970s. His modus operandi was carjackings, bank robberies and heists committed during hold-ups.

Trial and execution
Oyenusi together with six other members of his gang were executed on 8 September 1971 by a combined police and armed forces firing brigade. His execution was caught on film.

See also
 Lawrence Anini
 Mighty Joe

Notes

References

1971 deaths
Executed Nigerian people
Year of birth missing
20th-century executions by Nigeria
Nigerian bank robbers
20th-century criminals
Filmed executions
People executed by Nigeria by firing squad